These are the list of personnel changes in the NBA from the 1961–62 NBA season.

Events

August ?, 1961
 The Cincinnati Royals sold Mike Farmer to the St. Louis Hawks. Farmer played in the ABL in between.

August 2, 1961
 The Philadelphia Warriors hired Frank McGuire as head coach.

August 19, 1961
 The Philadelphia Warriors traded Joe Graboski to the St. Louis Hawks for Frank Radovich, Bob McDonald and cash.

September 12, 1961
 Dick Garmaker retired from the New York Knicks.

October 3, 1961
 The Detroit Pistons signed George Patterson as a free agent.

October 31, 1961
 The New York Knicks signed Doug Kistler as a free agent.

November 18, 1961
 The St. Louis Hawks fired Paul Seymour as head coach.

November 20, 1961
 The St. Louis Hawks hired Andrew Levane as head coach.

November 21, 1961
 The St. Louis Hawks traded Joe Graboski, Si Green and Woody Sauldsberry to the Chicago Packers for Barney Cable and Archie Dees.

November 29, 1961
 The Chicago Packers sold Vern Hatton to the Philadelphia Warriors.
 The Chicago Packers waived York Larese.

November 30, 1961
 The Philadelphia Warriors sold Vern Hatton to the St. Louis Hawks.
 The Philadelphia Warriors signed York Larese as a free agent.

December ?, 1961
 The Philadelphia Warriors sold Bob McNeill to the Los Angeles Lakers.
 The Los Angeles Lakers sold Bob Sims to the St. Louis Hawks.

December 1, 1961
 The Detroit Pistons sold Shellie McMillon to the St. Louis Hawks.

December 10, 1961
 The New York Knicks waived Doug Kistler.

December 11, 1961
 The Boston Celtics sold Al Butler to the New York Knicks.

December 28, 1961
 The Chicago Packers sold Joe Graboski to the Syracuse Nationals.

March 6, 1962
 The St. Louis Hawks signed Stacey Arceneaux as a free agent.

March 7, 1962
 The St. Louis Hawks reassigned Head Coach Andrew Levane.

March 9, 1962
 The St. Louis Hawks appointed Bob Pettit as head coach.

March 13, 1962
 The St. Louis Hawks hired Harry Gallatin as head coach.

June ?, 1962
 The St. Louis Hawks sold Clyde Lovellette to the Boston Celtics.

June 12, 1962
 The Chicago Packers fired Jim Pollard as head coach.

June 13, 1962
 The St. Louis Hawks waived Bob Sims.
 The St. Louis Hawks waived Stacey Arceneaux.

June 14, 1962
 The St. Louis Hawks traded Al Ferrari and Shellie McMillon to the Chicago Packers for Bill Bridges and Ralph Davis.

June 26, 1962
 The Chicago Packers signed Ralph Wells as a free agent.

July 24, 1962
 The Chicago Zephyrs hired Jack McMahon as head coach.

References
NBA Transactions at NBA.com
1961-62 NBA Transactions| Basketball-Reference.com

Transactions
NBA transactions